Nosratabad District is a district (bakhsh) in Zahedan County, Sistan and Baluchestan province, Iran. At the 2006 census, its population was 16,890, in 3,339 families.  The district has one city: Nosratabad. The district has two rural districts (dehestan): Dumak Rural District and Nosratabad Rural District. At the 2016 census, its population had risen to 18,642.

References 

Zahedan County
Districts of Sistan and Baluchestan Province
Populated places in Zahedan County